The Templum Domini (Vulgate translation of Hebrew:  "Temple of the Lord") was the name attributed by the Crusaders to the Dome of the Rock in Jerusalem.
It became an important symbol of Jerusalem, depicted on coins minted under the Catholic Christian Kingdom of Jerusalem.

The Dome of the Rock was erected in the late 7th century under the 5th Umayyad Caliph Abd al-Malik ibn Marwan at the site of the former Jewish Second Temple (or possibly added to an existing Byzantine building dating to the reign of Heraclius, 610–641). 
After the capture of Jerusalem in the First Crusade (1099), the Dome of the Rock was given into the care of Augustinian Canons Regular, who renovated it and consecrated it as a Catholic church.

The adjacent Al-Aqsa Mosque was called Templum Solomonis ("Temple of Solomon") by the Crusaders. It first became a royal palace. The image of the Dome, as representing the "Temple of Solomon", became an important iconographic element in the Kingdom of Jerusalem. The royal seals of the Kings of Jerusalem depicted the city symbolically by combining the Tower of David, the Church of the Holy Sepulchre, the Dome of the Rock and the city walls.

After the completion of the purpose-built royal palace near the Jaffa Gate, the King of Jerusalem gave the building to the Catholic monastic-military order, the Knights Templar, who maintained it as their headquarters. The Dome was indicated on the reverse of the seals of the Grand Masters of the Knights Templar (such as Everard des Barres and Renaud de Vichiers), and it is possibly the architectural model for round Templar churches across Europe.

Although the adjacent Dome of the Ascension was constructed as a baptistry during the Crusader period, it has since remained in the hands of Islamic authorities as part of the larger complex of the Dome of the Rock.

See also
History of Jerusalem during the Crusader period

References 

Roman Catholic churches in Jerusalem
Temple Mount
Castles and fortifications of the Knights Templar
Church buildings in the Kingdom of Jerusalem